Isobryales are an order of moss. Its taxonomic status is not clear. The Integrated Taxonomic Information System and National Center for Biotechnology Information databases consider it as a synonym of Bryidae and Hypnales, respectively. The Global Biodiversity Information Facility considers it valid in its own right.

Genera
As accepted by GBIF;

 Cyrtopodaceae (8)
 Fontinalaceae (94)
 Glyphomitriaceae (1)
 Hydropogonaceae (4)
 Lepyrodontaceae(13)
 Prionodontaceae (21)
 Ptychomniaceae (44)
 Regmatodontaceae (29)
 Rhacocarpaceae (1)
 Rutenbergiaceae (11)
 Trachypodaceae (80)
 Wardiaceae (2)

Figures in brackets are approx. how many species per genus.

Description
The order includes plants that generally grow from a creeping primary stem with reduced leaves, and plants that have spreading to ascending secondary stems which may be pinnately branched. Paraphyllia (tiny branched or stipuliform organs between the leaves) and pseudoparaphyllia are sometimes present on the stems. The leaves may have single or double and sometimes short costae (ribs). The cells may be short or elongate and smooth or papillose, with those at basal angles sometimes differentiated. The sporophytes are lateral, usually with elongate setae and capsules. The double peristome, sometimes reduced, consists of 16 teeth which are papillose on the outer surface, or less often cross-striate at the base, and an endostome with narrow segments and a low basal membrane or none at all. The calyptrae (the protective cap or hood covering the spore case) are cucullate (hooded) and naked, or mitrate and hairy.

References

Moss orders
Bryopsida